Barbara Mensah is a British judge of Ghanaian descent. She became the first circuit judge of African origin in England and Wales when she was appointed to the South Eastern Circuit in 2005. As of October 2016 she sits in Luton Crown Court, England.

Early life
Mensah was born in Ghana, the daughter of a business magnate. She lived in Ghana until she was six years when she moved to the United Kingdom. She was the first university graduate from her family.

Education
Mensah studied Philosophy at the University of Wales in Swansea before training to be a barrister. She is also an alumna of City University London and Queen Mary University London, both in London.

Career
Mensah was called to the Bar at Lincoln's Inn in 1984. Early on in her career she took up private sector work and then moved on to sit on a Financial Services Tribunal. She became interested in further judicial work. She was appointed a recorder in 2003. She was appointed as a circuit judge on the South Eastern Circuit in 2005 and is currently (2016) a circuit judge at the Luton Crown Court, the first woman of African descent to attain that position. She was awarded an honorary degree of juris doctor in 2015 by City, University of London in acknowledgement her contribution to the law profession.

Publications

References

Living people
Circuit judges (England and Wales)
Year of birth missing (living people)
Alumni of the University of Wales
Ghanaian emigrants to the United Kingdom
Members of Lincoln's Inn
1959 births
British judges